Leonard King Lesser (December 3, 1922 – February 16, 2011) was an American character actor. He was known for his recurring role as Uncle Leo in a total of 15 episodes of Seinfeld, starting during the show's second season in the episode "The Pony Remark". Lesser was also known for his role as Garvin on Everybody Loves Raymond.

Early life
Lesser was born in New York City in 1922. His father, a grocer, was a Jewish immigrant from Poland. Lesser received his bachelor's degree from the City College of New York in 1942 at the age of 19. Lesser enlisted in the United States Army the day after the attack on Pearl Harbor, and served in the China Burma India Theater during World War II. While there, he was promoted to sergeant.

Career
Lesser was a prolific character actor in film, TV and on stage. He appeared on American television steadily since 1955 on programs such as That Girl, The Untouchables, Peter Gunn, Mr. Lucky, The Outer Limits, Alfred Hitchcock Presents, Gunsmoke, Kentucky Jones, Green Acres, Get Smart, Bat Masterson, Family Affair, The Monkees, Quincy, M.E., The Rockford Files, The Amazing Spider-Man, Mad About You, All in the Family, Boy Meets World, Smart Guy, My Favorite Martian, The Munsters, and Castle. He appeared in a variety of films such as Birdman of Alcatraz (1962), How to Stuff a Wild Bikini (1965), Kelly's Heroes (1970), Blood and Lace (1971), Dirty Little Billy (1972), Papillon (1973), Truck Stop Women (1974), The Outlaw Josey Wales (1976), Supervan (1977), Moonshine County Express (1977), Ruby (1977), Death Hunt (1981), Take This Job and Shove It (1981), Grandmother's House (1988) and Baadasssss! (2003). He also guest starred on the Sabrina the Teenage Witch episode "Tick Tock Hilda's Clock."

Later years
Lesser had a recurring role on Everybody Loves Raymond as Garvin, a friend of Frank Barone, who always lifted his arms in excitement whenever he saw Ray (just as Lesser did in his recurring role on  Seinfeld as "Uncle Leo" whenever he saw his nephew Jerry). He also appeared in Jeff Seymour's stage production of Cold Storage at the University of Toronto's George Ignatieff Theatre.

Death
On February 16, 2011, Lesser died of cancer-related pneumonia in Burbank, California, at the age of 88.

After learning of Lesser's death, Jerry Seinfeld said of him,Len was one of our favorites. We always loved having him on the show. I'll never forget when Uncle Leo was in prison and tattooed "Jerry Hello" on his knuckles. He was a very sweet guy. Another Seinfeld castmate, Jason Alexander, tweeted,Thanks to all of you for your kind remarks re: Len Lessor [sic]. Tonight was the opening of Gigi at my beloved Reprise Theater Company and I've only returned at this late hour to hear the news. ... "Hellooo" Uncle Leo. And goodbye. Sleep well. Much love. Jason.

Selected filmography

Shack Out on 101 (1955) - Perch
Somebody Up There Likes Me (1956) - Reporter at Sparring Session (uncredited)
Lust for Life (1956) - Cartoonist (uncredited)
The Rack (1956) - Officer (uncredited)
This Could Be the Night (1957) - Piano Tuner (uncredited)
Slaughter on Tenth Avenue (1957) - Sam (uncredited)
The Brothers Karamazov (1958) - Jailer (uncredited)
I Want to Live! (1958) - Charlie, Newspaperman (uncredited)
Some Came Running (1958) - Indianapolis Poker Player (uncredited)
Crime and Punishment U.S.A. (1959) - Desk Officer
Please Don't Eat the Daisies (1960) - Waiter at Sardi's (uncredited)
Bells Are Ringing (1960) - Charlie Bessemer (uncredited)
Birdman of Alcatraz (1962) - Burns (uncredited)
Smog (1962) - Lelio Marpicati
McHale's Navy Joins the Air Force (1965) - NKVD commissar
How to Stuff a Wild Bikini (1965) - North Dakota Pete
The Wild Wild West (1965) - Mason
Fireball 500 (1966) - Man in Garage
The Last Challenge (1967) - Ed - the Bartender (uncredited)
Kelly's Heroes (1970) - Sergeant Bellamy
Bonanza (1970, TV Series) - Fred Gaskell
All in the Family (1971) - Billy Prendegast
Blood and Lace (1971) - Tom Kredge
Dirty Little Billy (1972) - Slits
Slither (1973) - Jogger
Papillon (1973) - Guard
It's Good to Be Alive (1974) - Man at Accident
Truck Stop Women (1974) - Winter
’’Kolchak: The Night Stalker’’(1974) - They Have Been, They Are.....
Death Wish (1974) - Cop at the Precinct (uncredited)
The Outlaw Josey Wales (1976) - Abe
Supervan (1977) - Banks
Moonshine County Express (1977) - Scoggins
Joyride to Nowhere (1977) - Charlie
Ruby (1977) - Barney
Spider-Man (1977) - Henchman
House Calls (1978) - Waiter
Someone's Watching Me! (1978) - Burly Man
The Main Event (1979) - Trainer At Big Bear
Take This Job and Shove It (1981) - Roach
Death Hunt (1981) - Lewis
Du-beat-e-o (1984) - Hendricks
Grandmother's House (1988) - Grandfather
Faith (1990) - Uncle Sal
Sorority Girls and the Creature from Hell (1990) - Tex
Ain't No Way Back (1990) - Papa Campbell
Seinfeld (1991-1998) - Uncle Leo
Rave Review (1994) - Al 
The John Larroquette Show - (1996) Preacher (1 episode) 
Everybody Loves Raymond (1996-2004) - Garvin
Boy Meets World (1997) - Arnie Heck (1 episode) 
Mad About You - (1997) Uncle Arnold (1 episode) 
Life with Roger (1997) - Mr. Mitchell (1 episode)
True Friends (1998) - Mr. Slotnick 
Caroline in the City (1998) - Waiter (1 episode)
The Werewolf Reborn! (1998)  
Smart Guy (1998) - Sidney (1 episode) 
The Secret Diary of Desmond Pfeiffer (1998) - Tailor (1 episode)Sabrina the Teenage Witch - Eugene (1 episode) Son of the Beach (2002) - Nick Pappasmearos Jr. (3 episodes) Just Shoot Me! (2003) - Uncle Jimmy (1 episode)Baadasssss! (2003) - Manny & Mort Goldberg Rock Me, Baby (2003) - Harvey (1 episode) Quintuplets (2004) - Morty (1 episode) Raw Footage (2005) - Grampa JoeyER (2005) - Woody Ebbots (1 episode) The Wedding Belles (2007) - Peppy Miller (1 episode) Cold Case (2007) - Elmer Gibbins '07 (1 episode)'Til Death (2008) - Gus (1 episode) Turbo Dates (2008) 
Castle (2009) - Neighbour (1 episode) (Final role)

References

External links
 
 

1922 births
2011 deaths
Male actors from New York City
American male film actors
American male television actors
Deaths from cancer in California
Deaths from pneumonia in California
Jewish American male actors
American people of Polish-Jewish descent
United States Army personnel of World War II
People from the Bronx
United States Army soldiers
21st-century American Jews